Adanga Maru is a 2018 Indian Tamil-language action thriller film written and directed by Karthik Thangavel. The film stars Jayam Ravi and Raashii Khanna, with Ponvannan, Babu Antony, Sampath Raj and Azhagam Perumal in supporting roles. The music was composed by Sam C. S., with cinematography by Sathyan Sooryan and editing by Ruben.

The film began production in December 2017 and was released on 21 December 2018. The film received mixed to positive response from critics and audience and became an commercial success at the box office.

Plot 
Subhash is a newly appointed SI in Chennai. He is sympathetic to the public's suffering and tries to improve their lives. These efforts sometimes conflict with the law and cause Subhash trouble with his superior Inspector Muthukaruppan.

Called to investigate a girl's suspected suicide, Subhash deduces that she was murdered and gathers evidence. He confronts Abhijith, a boy whose mobile phone was active near the crime scene, and the boy's friends Christy, Bhuvan, and Deepak. The boys reveal that they committed murders of several other girls, avoiding the consequences due to their parents' privilege, being the sons of a prominent businessman, the District Collector of Chennai city, a gold merchant, and a well-known scientist. The boys show Subhash a video of them assaulting the girl, and he becomes enraged and arrests them.

Corrupt JCP Saarangan asks Subhash for proof of the crimes but the videos have been deleted and the boys are released while Subhash is suspended from duty. The boys vow revenge, and Subhash returns home to discover his extended family have been murdered, except for one niece. Saarangan, who has been bribed with a Porsche Cayenne Car, declares that the deaths resulted from an accidental fire. Subhash resigns, defiantly telling Saarangan that he will avenge his family by ensuring that the four boys die at the hands of their fathers. Bhuvan is kidnapped by Subhash and locked in a car booby trapped with inflammable silane gas. His father opens the car door and witnesses Bhuvan burn alive in front of him. 

Subhash then kidnaps Deepak and Christy and hides them. The corrupt police try to secretly detain Subash, but he triggers Muthukaruppan's pistol which attracts public attention and forces them to officially arrest him. While in custody, Subhash reveals to Christy's father that Christy is in a van at the airport. The father finds Christy and tells him to run to the police for help, but Subhash had placed an illegal firearm in Christy's bag along with a beeping device. The National Security Guards mistake Christy for a terrorist and fatally shoot him to death. With technical help from Subhash's friend, Deepak's crimes are exposed in the Internet and a live video feed shows him inside a glass tank. 

The public is allowed to remotely release chemicals which will result in Deepak's death. Deepak's father hires hackers to stop this. Deepak is located and when his father breaks open the glass to release him, the chemicals are combined and Deepak is killed. In the meantime, Subhash warns Saarangan to check on his teenage daughter's safety. Saarangan panics but is relieved when she is found to be safe. Saarangan realises his hypocrisy and decides to support Subhash to fight for justice for the victims of the boys. Abhijit's father Sanjay has Subhash released from custody, intending to make a deal. 

Subhash kidnaps Abhijit and dangles him from a rope at a great height; he threatens to publicise the recovered video evidence of the boys' crimes, thereby ruining Sanjay and his reputation. Sanjay is given a chance to prevent this by shutting down a computer, but would have to let go of the rope. Sanjay does so, letting his son fall to his death to preserve his reputation. One year later, Subhash has become an IPS officer, and continues to murder unconvictable lawbreakers to serve justice.

Cast

Production 
In December 2017, Jayam Ravi announced on social media that his 23rd film would be an action-thriller titled Adanga Maru by first-time director Karthik Thangavel. Raashi Khanna was announced as the female lead, this being her second Tamil film after Imaikkaa Nodigal (2018). Stunt choreographer Stun Siva's son, Kevin Kumar, made his debut as a stunt choreographer in this film. Filming was completed in October 2018.

Soundtrack 
The soundtrack was composed by Sam C. S. The audio rights were acquired by Sony Music in August 2018.

Release and reception 
Adanga Maru was released on 21 December 2018. Thinkal Menon of The Times of India rated it 3 out of 5, saying, "Adanga Maru has a routine plot, but the treatment makes it fast-paced and interesting." Behindwoods wrote, "Adangamarus fresh screenplay and packaging makes this intense revenge drama a good watch." The Hindu wrote, "thanks to its speedy screenplay, Adanga Maru finishes as a fairly engaging watch." India Today wrote, "Debutant director Karthik Thangavel's Adanga Maru starring Jayam Ravi could have been a flawless cop thriller, but it misses the mark by a few inches." The Indian Express wrote, "A more nuanced, well-thought-out storyline with better CGI [computer-generated imagery] could have definitely elevated the revenge saga. Adanga Maru is strictly a one-time watch."

References

External links 
 

2018 films
2010s Tamil-language films
2018 action thriller films
2018 action drama films
2018 crime action films
2010s police films
Indian action drama films
Indian action thriller films
Indian crime action films
Indian police films
Indian vigilante films
Indian films about revenge
Films about rape in India
Indian rape and revenge films
Films scored by Sam C. S.
2018 directorial debut films
2010s vigilante films
Indian thriller films